Tapinella may refer to:
 Tapinella (insect), a psocoptera genus in the family Pachytroctidae
 Tapinella (fungus), a fungal genus in the family Tapinellaceae